Hongliang is a Chinese given name. Notable people with the name include:

Duanmu Hongliang (1912–1996), Chinese author
Wang Hongliang (born 1985), Chinese footballer
 (born 1955), Chinese author

Chinese given names